Mount Dyson is a summit in Alberta, Canada.

Mount Dyson was named for a cattleman.

References

Dyson
Alberta's Rockies